The Battle of Vasylkiv was a military engagement between the Russian Federation and Ukraine on 26 February 2022, during the 2022 Russian invasion of Ukraine.

Battle
Heavy fighting between the Russian paratroopers and Ukrainian defenders occurred in the city.

According to Ukrainian officials, at 01:30, a Ukrainian Su-27 fighter jet shot down a Russian Ilyushin Il-76 carrying paratroopers. At 03:20, a second Il-76 was allegedly shot down over the nearby city of Bila Tserkva.

The mayor of Vasylkiv, Natalia Balasynovych, stated that over 200 Ukrainians were wounded in the engagement. She later claimed that Ukrainian forces had repelled the assault by Russian paratroopers on the military air base near the city and the central street, with the situation in the city having calmed down. The Wall Street Journal reported that Ukrainian forces patrolled the city in the morning and were searching for Russian stragglers.

Confirmation of the Russian Il-76 losses has yet to be produced. According to The Guardian, "no convincing public evidence has surfaced about the two downed planes, or about a drop of paratroopers in Vasylkiv".

The New York Times cited unnamed Ukrainian officials, that at least part of the attackers were sleeper cells, who, according to the mayor of Vasylkiv, Natalia Balasynovych, had bought apartments and brought their families in the month before the invasion. Ukrainian territorial defense units had not found any evidence of wrecked planes in the surrounding area.

Aftermath

February and March
In the early morning of 27 February, a Russian missile struck an oil depot in Vasylkiv, setting it ablaze. On 12 March, a Russian rocket attack destroyed the air base.

April
On 2 April 2022 the whole of Kyiv Oblast, where Vasylkiv is located in, was declared free of "invaders" by the Ukrainian Ministry of Defense after Russian troops had left the area.

See also 
 Battle of Antonov Airport

References 

February 2022 events in Ukraine
Vasylkiv
Kyiv offensive (2022)
Vasylkiv
History of Kyiv Oblast